Thermal keratoses are keratotic skin lesions produced in the skin by exposure to infrared radiation.

References 

Epidermal nevi, neoplasms, and cysts